Gamasellus litoprothrix is a species of mite in the family Ologamasidae.

References

litoprothrix
Articles created by Qbugbot
Animals described in 1966